Third Day was a Christian rock band formed in Marietta, Georgia during the 1990s. The band was founded by lead singer Mac Powell, guitarist Mark Lee (both of whom were the only constant members) and Billy Wilkins. Drummer David Carr was the last band member to quit, prior to the band’s farewell tour in May and June 2018. The band's name is a reference to the biblical accounts of the resurrection of Jesus on the third day following his crucifixion. The band was inducted into the Georgia Music Hall of Fame on September 19, 2009. They have sold over 7 million albums in the United States and had 28 number one Christian album chart radio hits. Their fans are known as "Gomers" after a song on their second album about Gomer.

History

Forming years and independent recordings (1991–1994) 
In 1991, high-schoolers Mac Powell and Mark Lee formed Third Day as a Christian music group with pianist Billy Wilkins and guitarist August McCoy. McCoy left the following year to pursue tertiary education. At a 1992 event at Lee's Church, Third Day performed alongside a band called the Bullard Family Singers, which featured David Carr and Tai Anderson. Third Day invited Carr and Anderson to join them shortly after.

In 1993, the band started playing more frequently in the Atlanta region in order to make money to record an album. Wilkins left the group in order to pursue his teaching career. Third Day recorded at Furies Studios in Atlanta and with the production help of Carr, Long Time Forgotten was released in 1994, producing and selling 2,000 copies. In 1995, the band started looking for a second guitarist. After hearing Brad Avery play with singer Chris Carder, Avery was asked to audition. After playing Consuming Fire during the first rehearsal, Avery was officially asked to join the band.

The band's second album, Contagious, was self-financed for $3,000 and recorded at Furies Studios. 1,000 CDs and cassette copies of the demo were released. While playing in Marietta, at the Strand Theatre, the owners offered the band a contract to sign with new independent record label Gray Dot Records. The band released the album Third Day, which sold 20,000 copies. Shortly after, Reunion Records bought out their Gray Dot contract and signed the band to a multi-album deal.

Recording contract with Reunion Records (1995–1997) 
Reunion Records released the now official version of Third Day, which has sold over 300,000 copies and was well received by critics. The album also yielded their only mainstream rock radio hit in the U.S., "Nothing at All", which peaked at No. 34 on the Billboard rock charts. Later in 1995, Christian music headliner Newsboys asked Third Day to open for them at five West Coast shows. The band also launched their own 65-city tour with All Star United and Seven Day Jesus opening for them.

In 1996, the band was nominated for a Dove Award in the category of New Artist of the Year and their video for Consuming Fire directed by Chris Metzler and Jeff Springer won a Billboard Music Award in the category of Best Christian Video. The video was shot on location in Bombay Beach, California and other places around the Salton Sea. This experience and discovering Leonard Knight's Salvation Mountain nearby later inspired the album artwork for the band's album Revelation.

In 1997, the band started working on their second album, Conspiracy No. 5. The album was produced by Sam Taylor, who had previously worked with King's X and other Christian bands. The album was nominated for a Grammy and won Dove Awards for Rock Album of the Year and Rock Song of the Year ("Alien"). The following year, the band toured around the United States, both alone and again opening for Newsboys. Also in 1998, the band recorded a cover of Michael W. Smith's "Agnus Dei" for his Dove Award-winning compilation project Exodus.

Mainstream and international success (1998–2006) 
In 1998, the band started working on Time with Monroe Jones as the producer. Time was nominated for a Grammy Award and won another Dove Award for the band. Some of the songs that were recorded for possible inclusion in the album, but left out during production, are on the EP Southern Tracks. During the band's live shows they included a significant portion of worship music, prompting the band to release an album made up exclusively of worship songs. The subsequent album Offerings: A Worship Album took about a week to record. In 2000, to support both Time and Offerings, Third Day went on tour alongside Jennifer Knapp. Later in the same year, the band collaborated on the project City on a Hill: Songs of Worship and Praise with FFH, Caedmon's Call, Peter Furler of Newsboys, Jars of Clay, and others.

In 2001, the band played in Australia and New Zealand on the heels of the success of the Offerings album. While touring in the US, Third Day recorded a concert attended by 15,000 fans at the HiFi Buys Amphitheatre in Atlanta to be released as their first DVD, The Offerings Experience. That same year, the band won five Dove Awards as well as their first Grammy. They closed the year with the release of their fifth studio album, Come Together, which won two Dove Awards and a Grammy. The album was certified gold the next year, along with Time. The band appeared in the 2002 film Joshua, the movie version of the story of Joseph Girzone. The Third Day song My Hope is You was included in the Joshua soundtrack album. In 2003, the band released a follow-up to their hit worship CD Offerings entitled Offerings II: All I Have to Give.

In 2004, the band released their seventh album, Wire, and toured the States with tobyMac and Warren Barfield. In June of the same year, they traveled to Europe for a two-week tour. Upon returning the band recorded a concert at Louisville and released it as the live album, Live Wire. During the same year, they collaborated on the soundtrack for Mel Gibson's film, The Passion of the Christ, played at the Republican National Convention and were featured on 60 Minutes. In January 2007, the band played one night each in Melbourne, Brisbane, and Sydney, Australia.

The band's next album, Wherever You Are, debuted on the Billboard 200 at No. 8. It also won the band their third Grammy Award.

Christmas and compilation albums (2006–2008) 
The band recorded and released its first Christmas-themed album, Christmas Offerings, in 2006. In 2007, they released their first compilations of hits, Chronology.

On February 28, 2008, Third Day released a statement announcing Brad Avery's departure from the band after 13 years and over 1,000 concerts. According to the official press release, Avery left the band to pursue solo projects and Third Day would not replace him, continuing on as a quartet. Following Avery's departure, the band performed at the April 2008 Papal Youth Rally at St. Joseph's Seminary in Yonkers, N.Y.

Revelation and Live Revelations (2008–2010) 
Supporting the July 29, 2008, release of their new album Revelation, the band appeared on The Tonight Show with Jay Leno where they performed the album's first single Call My Name and on November 20, 2008, they appeared on The Late Late Show with Craig Ferguson performing the album's title track. The song This Is Who I Am also appears in EA Sports NASCAR video game NASCAR 09, though the album was released over a month after the game. "Call My Name" hit No. 1 and was the fifth most-played song on R&R magazine's Christian CHR chart for 2008.

In April 2009, the band released a live version of the album Revelation under the title Live Revelations as a CD/DVD combination. Third Day was inducted into the Georgia Music Hall of Fame on September 19, 2009. In December 2009, Third Day was nominated for three Grammy Awards, with Live Revelations winning Best Rock or Rap Gospel Album, their fourth career Grammy, and receiving nominations for "Born Again" in the two categories Best Gospel Performance and Best Gospel Song. Live Revelations achieved Gold status in its month of release, becoming the band's eighth album to do so.

Move (2010) 
Third Day was featured on Winter Jam 2010, touring alongside a variety of contemporary Christian groups including the Newsboys, Fireflight, and Tenth Avenue North. After releasing the single, "Lift Up Your Face" in July 2010, Third Day released their tenth studio album, Move, on October 19, 2010. On October 30 they finished the World Vision-sponsored tour Make a Difference Tour 2010 with TobyMac, Michael W. Smith, Jason Gray, and Max Lucado in Fayetteville, NC. The group's song "Follow Me There" from Move is featured as the theme song to the TLC Television show Sarah Palin's Alaska which debuted in 2010.

Miracle and Lead Us Back: Songs of Worship (2012–2017) 
Third Day released Miracle on November 6, 2012. The band toured Miracle on the Miracle Tour with artists Colton Dixon and Josh Wilson as their opening acts, commencing on February 21, 2013, in Fairfax, Virginia and concluding on May 19, 2014, in Orlando.

Third Day released the worship album Lead Us Back: Songs of Worship on March 3, 2015. The album, produced by The Sound Kids (Jonny Macintosh and JT Daly) as a worship experience with Third Day at the center of a "friend choir", peaked at No. 20 on the Billboard 200, No. 1 on the Christian Albums chart, No. 5 on the Top Rock Albums chart and No. 13 on the Digital Albums chart. The album has had one single, "Soul on Fire", that spent 19 weeks on the Billboard charts, peaking at No. 2 on Hot Christian Songs and No. 3 on Christian Digital Songs. In 2015, bassist Tai Anderson announced he would take "a break from the upcoming touring season with Third Day". Anderson has been with the band for 23 years.

Revival and farewell (2017–2018) 
To celebrate their 25th anniversary, Third Day released the back-to-their-roots album, Revival, on August 4, 2017, recorded at FAME Studios in Muscle Shoals, Alabama. Third Day reunited with producer Monroe Jones, who had worked with Third Day on six previous albums including Time, Offerings I and II, and Come Together.

On March 2, 2018, Third Day announced their farewell with 12 shows as a last chance to see them live. The farewell tour eventually expanded to 20 concerts. June 27, 2018, in Denver was the final show added.

Members 
 Mac Powell – lead vocals, acoustic guitar, tambourine (1991–2018)
 Mark Lee – electric guitar, backing vocals (1991–2018)
 David Carr – drums, percussion (1992–2017)
 Tai Anderson – bass, backing vocals (1992–2015)
 Brad Avery – guitar (1995–2008). From Third Day Weblog by Third Day. "Third Day and Brad Avery have made the very difficult decision to part ways. We appreciate Brad's many contributions to the band's career to date, including his work on our forthcoming album, but the time has come for us to follow our separate paths. He has been an important part of Third Day for the last 13 years as we've traveled the world together and performed over 1,000 concerts. We will miss him as a band member but he will always remain our brother and our friend. Brad is a wonderful person, gifted songwriter and talented musician. We trust that God has amazing plans for his future." Avery left the band on February 28, 2008.
 Scotty Wilbanks – keyboards, backing vocals (2005–2018)
 Tim Gibson – bass guitar (2015–2018)
 Trevor Morgan – mandolin, banjo, guitar, backing vocals (2016–2018)
 Billy Wilkins – keyboards (1991–1994). Wilkins was one of the original members of Third Day, from 1991 to 1994, along with Powell and Lee. He was also with the group when Anderson and Carr joined, both of whom were still in high school at the time. He has not recorded with Third Day since 2004, when he played "Blessed Assurance". In 2007, early footage was released on the two projects Chronology I Chronology and II, on which Wilkins is included.
 Geof Barkley – keyboards, backing vocals (1993). Barkley (formerly of Geoff Moore and the Distance) played keyboards on every live album in the band's history and every live show for nearly seven years. Barkley also performed on Wherever You Are. Although never officially a member of the band, Brad Avery has described Barkley as '"in the band", but he's not a "member" of Third Day, that's two different things. But he is in the band, and he plays with us live every night, and he rocks.' Barkley's background vocals in songs such as "God of Wonders" and "Took My Place" as well as "You Are So Good To Me" have become integral parts of Third Day's live sound. Barkley finished touring with Third Day on October 21, 2005, in Raleigh, North Carolina.
 August McCoy – guitar (1991–1992)
 Jason Hoard – mandolin, banjo, guitar, backing vocals (2010–2012, 2018)
 Boone Daughdrill – drums (2018)
 Brian Bunn – guitar, harmonica (2012–2016)

Timeline

Discography

Awards 
As of 2020 the group has received 4 Grammy Awards and 25 Dove Awards.

American Music Awards

Grammy Awards

Gospel Music Awards

Billboard magazine best of the 2000s 
 No. 3 Christian Albums Artist of the Decade
 No. 5 Christian Songs Artist of the Decade
 No. 15 Christian Song of the Decade: "Cry Out to Jesus"
 No. 27 Christian Song of the Decade: "Call My Name"
 No. 39 Christian Song of the Decade: "You Are So Good to Me"
 No. 43 Christian Song of the Decade: "Mountain of God"
 No. 28 Christian Album of the Decade: "Wherever You Are"
 No. 33 Christian Album of the Decade: "Come Together"
 No. 37 Christian Album of the Decade: "Offerings: A Worship Album"
 No. 39 Christian Album of the Decade: "Offerings II: All I Have to Give"

References

External links 

 
 Interview with Third Day at Premier.tv
 
 2018 Farewell Tour

1991 establishments in Georgia (U.S. state)
Christian rock groups from Georgia (U.S. state)
Essential Records (Christian) artists
Grammy Award winners
Musical groups established in 1991
Musical groups from Atlanta
Performers of contemporary Christian music
Reunion Records artists
American southern rock musical groups